National emblems of Barbados are the symbols that are used in Barbados to represent the independent nation. The emblems reflect different aspects of its cultural life and history.

List of symbols

Former List of symbols

Flag 
The trident centred within the flag is a representation of the mythological Neptune, god of the sea. The trident in its original unbroken form was taken from the former colonial seal, which itself was replaced by the current coat of arms. Used within the national flag, the left and right shafts of the trident were then designed as 'broken' representing the nation of Barbados breaking away from its historical and constitutional ties as a former colony.

The three points of the trident represent in Barbados the three principles of democracy—"government of, for and by the people." The broken trident is set in a centred vertical band of gold representing the sands of Barbados' beaches. The gold band itself is surrounded on both sides by vertical bands of ultramarine (blue) representing the sea and sky of Barbados.

The design for the flag was created by Grantley W. Prescod and was chosen from an open competition arranged by the Barbados government. Over a thousand entries were received.

Heraldry 

The coat of arms depicts two animals which are supporting the shield. On the left is a "dolphin" which is symbolic of the fishing industry. On the right is a pelican which is symbolic of a small island named Pelican Island that once existed off the coast of Bridgetown. Above the shield is the helmet of Barbados with an extended arm clutching two sugar-cane stalks. The "cross" formation made by the cane stalks represents the saltire cross upon which Saint Andrew was crucified. On the base of the Coat of Arms reads "Pride and Industry".

Golden Shield 
The Golden Shield in the coat of arms carries two "Pride of Barbados" flowers (Caesalpinia pulcherrima) and the "bearded" fig tree, which was common on the island at the time of its settlement by the British and may have contributed to Barbados being so named.

Flower 

The national flower is the Pride of Barbados or Caesalpinia pulcherrima (L.) Sw., which grows across the island.

National heroes 

In April 1998, the Order of National Heroes Act was passed by the Parliament of Barbados. According to the government, the act established that 28 April (the centenary of the birth of Sir Grantley Adams) would be celebrated as National Heroes' Day. The act also declared that there are ten national heroes of Barbados, all of whom would be elevated to the title of "The Right Excellent". On the first day of Barbados as a parliamentary presidential republic, the government conferred the title of National Hero to singer Rihanna in 2021, raising the number to eleven National Heroes.

The eleven official National Heroes of Barbados are:
Bussa (−1816)
Sarah Ann Gill (1795–1866)
Samuel Jackman Prescod (1806–1871)
Dr. Charles Duncan O’Neal (1879–1936)
Clement Osbourne Payne (1904–1941)
Sir Grantley Herbert Adams (1898–1971)
Rt. Hon. Errol Walton Barrow (1920–1987)
Sir Hugh Worrell Springer (1913–1994)
Sir Garfield St. Aubyn Sobers (born 1936)
Sir Frank Walcott (1916–1999)
Rihanna (born 1988)

See also 
 Barbados National Pledge

References

External links
List of colonial symbols, FOTW
List of medals awarded by the Government, Medals of the World
Great seals of Barbados, Hubert de Vries
Great Seals of William + Mary and George III, History box

 
National emblems